&Jalan Semenyih–Kuala Klawang (Selangor state route B32  or Negeri Sembilan state route B32) is a road connecting Semenyih of Hulu Langat district in Selangor and Kuala Klawang in Jelebu district of Negeri Sembilan. This road is known to have many dangerous sharp corners. This road is not a commonly used route; the more popular routes to Kuala Klawang are the Kajang–Seremban Highway and then Federal Route 86 from Seremban's Ampangan exit.

To access this road, one  must use  Jalan Semenyih (Selangor State Route B19), Selangor State Road B116 (Jalan Sungai Tekali) or  Jalan Gunung Nuang (Selangor State Road B52) and Federal Road 1 (from Kajang). There is a high risk of roadkill when using this road; wild animals are known to roam free here. The JKR cut some corners located from the start of the road at Semenyih to the border of Negeri Sembilan. Not far from the border of Negeri Sembilan, there is a small waterfall beside the road. The road used to have a very dangerous corner near the waterfall, but now the corner is cut by JKR. Now, the waterfall is at arm's length from the road. If you using this road, you are unaware of the waterfall.

List of junctions

Roads in Selangor
Roads in Negeri Sembilan